Assara murasei is a species of snout moth in the genus Assara. It was described by Hiroshi Yamanaka in 2008 and originates from Japan.

References

Moths described in 2008
Phycitini
Moths of Japan